Chhabi Biswas may refer to:

 Chhabi Biswas- was an Indian actor,
 Chhabi Biswas (politician)-  is a Bangladesh Awami League politician and the former Member of Parliament from Netrokona-1.